Bromodomain-containing protein 4 is a protein that in humans is encoded by the BRD4 gene.

BRD4 is a member of the BET (bromodomain and extra terminal domain) family, which also includes BRD2, BRD3, and BRDT. BRD4, similar to other BET family members, contains two bromodomains that recognize acetylated lysine residues. BRD4 also has an extended C-terminal domain with little sequence homology to other BET family members.

Structure 

The two bromodomains in BRD4, termed BD1 and BD2, consist of 4 alpha-helices linked by 2 loops. The ET domain structure  is made up of 3 alpha-helices and a loop. The C-terminal domain of BRD4 has been implicated in promoting gene transcription through interaction with the transcription elongation factor P-TEFb and RNA polymerase II.

Function 

The protein encoded by this gene is homologous to the murine protein MCAP, which associates with chromosomes during mitosis, and to the human BRD2 (RING3) protein, a serine/threonine kinase. Each of these proteins contains two bromodomains, a conserved sequence motif which may be involved in chromatin targeting. This gene has been implicated as the chromosome 19 target of translocation t(15;19)(q13;p13.1), which defines the NUT midline carcinoma. Two alternatively spliced transcript variants have been described.

Role in cancer 

Most cases of NUT midline carcinoma involve translocation of the BRD4 gene with NUT genes. BRD4 is often required for expression of Myc and other "tumor driving" oncogenes in hematologic cancers including multiple myeloma, acute myelogenous leukemia and acute lymphoblastic leukaemia.

BRD4 is a major target of BET inhibitors, a class of pharmaceutical drugs currently being evaluated in clinical trials.

Interactions 

Notably, BRD4 interacts with P-TEFb via its P-TEFb interaction domain (PID), thereby stimulating its kinase activity and stimulating its phosphorylation of the carboxy-terminal domain (CTD) of RNA polymerase II. Recent review.

BRD4 has been shown to interact with GATA1, JMJD6, RFC2, RFC3, RFC1, RFC4 and RFC5.

BRD4 has also been implicated in binding with the diacetylated Twist protein, and the disruption of this interaction has been shown to suppress tumorigenesis in basal-like breast cancer.

BRD4 has also been shown to interact with a variety of inhibitors, such as MS417; inhibition of BRD4 with MS417 has been shown to down-regulate NF-κB activity seen in  HIV-associated kidney disease. BRD4 also interacts with apabetalone (RVX-208), which is being evaluated for treatment of atherosclerosis and cardiovascular disease.

References

External links

Further reading 

 
 
 
 
 
 
 
 
 
 
 
 
 
 
 
 
 

Proteins